Universitas is a student newspaper in Oslo, Norway, published since 1946. With a weekly circulation of 17,000, Universitas is one of Europe's largest student newspapers. It is distributed on campuses of institutions of higher learning that are affiliated with the Student Welfare Organisation in Oslo. The newspaper is considered as student welfare and is partly paid for by the students' semester fee. Universitas is published both in Norwegian and English (the Internet edition). The newspaper's principles state that Universitas is a newspaper made by students, for students. The publication's first editor was the to-be professor in literature and Henrik Ibsen expert, Daniel Haakonsen.

In the early years, Universitas had an editorial council, where professor names like Arne Næss and Ragnar Frisch figured. In more recent years, many profiles from Norwegian media has started their careers in the newspaper, including Øystein Sørensen, Kjetil Rolness, Ivar Hippe and Tor Edvin Dahl. Many illustrators also began drawing for Universitas: Ellen Auensen, Christopher Nielsen, Mikael Holmberg, Ola A. Hegdal and Karine Haaland.

Today, Universitas is produced by a staff led by the full-time engaged chief editor and the assisting editor. Part-time working section chiefs have responsibility for their respective working area (photo editor, chief of news section, chief of culture section, chief of feature section, debates editor, editor of Internet publication, editor of reviews section). About 25 journalists and photographers work on a regular basis, paid per contribution. Universitas is published in study semesters. Aside from editorial staff, an administrative director and a sales director work in Universitas.

In 1990, the paper again boosted the publishing rate and became a weekly (in semesters); it had given out 9-16 editions per year since 1954. In 2004, it went up from 32 to 34 editions per year, and from 2009, it will publish 35 editions per year. The circulation is 17,000 copies.

Universitas receive funding from the Student Welfare Organisation in Oslo, granted through the Welfare Council, a welfare body put together by the local student democracies at institutions affiliated to the Student Welfare Organisation. Universitas is consequently distributed to all institutions affiliated to the Student Welfare Organisation, that is the University of Oslo, the Norwegian School of Management (BI), the Norwegian School of Sport Sciences (NIH), the Norwegian Academy of Music (NMH), the MF Norwegian School of Theology (MF), the Oslo School of Architecture and Design (AHO), the Oslo National Academy of the Arts (KHiO) and the Norwegian School of Veterinary Science (NVH).

The chief editor is employed for one calendar year. Chief editor in 2009 is Aksel Kjær Vidnes. Every semester Universitas employs journalists, photographers and designers. Administrative director since autumn 2002 has been Camilla Svendsen Skriung and chair board leder in 2008-2010 is Haakon Riekeles. The newspaper's location is in Moltke Moes vei at Blindern, the main campus of the University of Oslo.

External links 
 Universitas
 History and statistics

Weekly newspapers published in Norway
Newspapers published in Oslo
Publications established in 1946
1946 establishments in Norway
University of Oslo